"Fool's Day" is a song by English rock band Blur. It was released on 17 April 2010 and is the band's first single since 2003's "Good Song". The track was released as a 7" for Record Store Day, with only 1000 copies made. On 18 April 2010, to "avoid fans having to illegally obtain an inferior copy of this track from pirate sites", Blur made the song a free download on their website in both MP3 and WAV formats. The single is the first featuring guitarist Graham Coxon since 2000's "Music Is My Radar".

Reception
Reception of the highly anticipated single was generally positive. NME reviewer Matt Wilkinson called the single "a bit bloody fantastic" in his review of the song. This Is Fake DIYs Stephen Ackroyd stated in his review that "It'd be fair to say elements of every era [of the band's sound] find themselves sitting pretty, though in such a way it still feels fresh – understated, sure, but with a touch of magic few other bands can match". The Guardians Tim Jonze said it was "rather lovely".

Personnel
Damon Albarn: vocals, synthesizers
Graham Coxon: guitar
Alex James: bass guitar
Dave Rowntree: drums

Music video
Despite its small release, the song had a music video. Although all direction and production in the video is unknown, it completely consists of a close-up of a record needle, playing the "Fool's Day" 7" vinyl. It was posted up onto the Parlophone YouTube page in 2010.

References

External links

Blur (band) songs
2010 singles
Songs written by Damon Albarn
Songs written by Graham Coxon
Songs written by Alex James (musician)
Songs written by Dave Rowntree
Record Store Day releases
2010 songs
Parlophone singles